Events from the year 1628 in Ireland.

Incumbent
Monarch: Charles I

Events
1 January – the first seminarians enter into residence at the Irish College in Rome, established by Cardinal Ludovisi.
Members of the Parliament of Ireland propose The Graces, in an attempt to reverse anti-Catholic legislation.

Births 
14 February – Valentine Greatrakes, faith healer (died 1682)

Deaths
11 July – William Daniel, Church of Ireland Archbishop of Tuam.

References

 
1620s in Ireland
Ireland
Years of the 17th century in Ireland